Babasaheb Bhosale was appointed as the Chief Minister of Maharashtra on resignation of A. R. Antulay in January 1982. Bhosale had been law, labour, and transport minister in Antulay's cabinet. Bhosale's government served for about a year, until he was replaced by Vasantdada Patil in February 1983.

List of ministers
Bhosale's cabinet was sworn in on 25 January 1982, and expanded on 11 October 1982.

References

Indian National Congress
1982 in Indian politics
B
Cabinets established in 1982
Cabinets disestablished in 1983